Mariano Gastón Bracamonte (born 24 April 1999) is an Argentine professional footballer who plays as a defender for Deportivo Morón.

Career
Bracamonte's career started with Deportivo Morón. He made his senior debut in the club's Primera B Nacional match with Quilmes on 24 February 2019, participating for seventy-eight minutes of a 1–0 victory.

Career statistics
.

References

External links

1999 births
Living people
Place of birth missing (living people)
Argentine footballers
Association football defenders
Primera Nacional players
Deportivo Morón footballers